Qasr-e Qand (also Romanized as Qaşr-e Qand and Qaşr Qand; also known as Barqān and Borgan) is a city in and the capital of Qasr-e Qand County, in Sistan and Baluchestan Province, Iran. At the 2006 census, its population was 10,826, in 1,586 families.

References

Populated places in Qasr-e Qand County

Cities in Sistan and Baluchestan Province